The Queens Night Market, also known as the Queens International Night Market, is New York City's first open-air space inspired by the Asian night market phenomenon. The event launched in Flushing Meadows-Corona Park in Queens in April 2015, with 40 vendors. Since then, it operates on Saturday nights from April through October.
, the event averages over 10,000 visitors on Saturday nights.

The market hosts independent vendors each night, selling food, art, and merchandise; as of 2019, it has featured food from over 80 countries. When it launched in 2015, it introduced a $5 price cap on all food available for sale at the event. The price cap has since been raised to $6.

A cookbook with vendor stories and recipes, The World Eats Here: Amazing Food and the Inspiring People Who Make It at New York's Queens Night Market by John Wang and Storm Garner, was published in 2020.

The event has ATMs, sells beer and wine, and hosts live entertainment each Saturday night. To date, the event has hosted approximately 200 free live performances.

The event was paused during the COVID-19 pandemic in New York City in 2020. It reopened with ticketed entry under public health regulations in June 2021 and resumed regular operations in July 2021.

References

External link
 Official site

Flushing Meadows–Corona Park
Food markets in the United States
Night markets in the United States